Bamzar may refer to:
 Bamzar, Fars (بمزر - Bamzar)
 Bamzar, Khuzestan (بامزار - Bāmzār)